War Vol. 1 is an album split between the Finnish symphonic black metal band ...and Oceans and the Norwegian death/black metal band Bloodthorn. The two bands recorded two completely new songs and covered each other's work alongside that of a third band, this time GGFH.

Track listing
...Ja Kylmä Vesi Nuolee Oksaa (...And the Cold Water Licks the Branch)
100 Meters Final (Accelerate)
Flesh (GGFH cover)
Breeding the Evil Inside (Bloodthorn cover)
Spite
The End Offensive (War III)
Dead Men Don't Rape (GGFH cover)
Kärsimyksien Vaaleat Kädet (The White Hands of Sufferings) (...And Oceans cover)

Havoc Unit albums
1998 albums